The Breda Ba.27 was a fighter produced in Italy in the 1930s, used by the Chinese Nationalist Air Force in the Second Sino-Japanese War.

Design and development
The Ba.27 was a low-wing braced monoplane with fixed tailwheel undercarriage. As originally designed, the Ba.27 had a fuselage of steel tube construction, skinned with light corrugated alloy metal, and wooden wings and tailplane. Evaluation of the two prototypes by the Regia Aeronautica in 1933 was strongly negative, resulting in an extensive redesign of the aircraft. The fuselage shape was made more rounded and the pilot's open cockpit was moved higher and forward to improve visibility. The corrugated skinning was also replaced with smooth sheet metal.

A prototype of this revised version, known as the Metallico, was first flown in June 1934, but Regia Aeronautica's appraisal was only a little more positive.

Operational history
Despite the lack of domestic interest, the type was ordered by the Republic of China for use against Japan. Out of eighteen machines ordered, only eleven were actually delivered.

Variants
Ba.27
Initial prototype, two built.
Ba.27 Metallico
Second improved version, twelve built.

Operators

Chinese Nationalist Air Force received eleven aircraft.

Specifications (Metallico)

See also

References

Bibliography

External links

 Breda Ba.27
 Breda Ba.27

Ba.027
1930s Italian fighter aircraft
Single-engined tractor aircraft
Low-wing aircraft
Aircraft first flown in 1933
Conventional landing gear